Dr. Ignatz Theodor Griebl (born in 1899) was a prominent German-American physician and a recruiter for the German spy network in New York City.

Early life 
Ignatz T. Griebl was born in Bavaria, a southeastern state in Germany in 1899. He served in the German army as a First Lieutenant Artillery Officer during World War I but was injured during a battle at the Italian front. He later went on to study medicine at the University of Munich and immigrated to the United States of America in 1925. He first started a practice in Maine but subsequently moved to Yorkville, New York due to the large community of German-Americans in that region. His medical practice focused on obstetrics.

Espionage 
Dr. Ignatz Griebl became head of the German spy network in New York, responsible for the recruitment of German spies into their network. In 1938, about three years after his immigration into the United States, an FBI Special Agent Leon G. Turrou ran an investigation that targeted Nazi German spies actively working within the United States. Part of his method of investigation was the use of polygraph tests on potential German espionage candidates. Dr. Ignatz T. Griebl was one of seven other subjects who were placed for the mandatory polygraph tests. According to notes, he was the most interesting subject of the test. After it was administered (on May 5, 1938), Dr. Griebl "made us relax all vigilance, all watchfulness over him." However, it was noticeable to the FBI agents that Dr. Griebl was worried and must have felt like he had given himself up.

Five days later, it was discovered that Dr. Ignatz T. Griebl had fled to Germany aboard the S.S. Bremen.

Griebl was interviewed by representatives of the New York U.S. Attorney Office at the American Consulate in Berlin, Germany on September 17, 1938. Griebl agreed to the meeting in hopes of obtaining the release of his wife then under bail in New York in connection with the espionage trial. At the time he was reported to be employed as a physician in Vienna.

Griebl survived WWII. On August 19, 1945, he was arrested in Salzburg, Austria, by Allied authorities. He was recognized while applying for a travel permit from the Allied Military Government.

Griebl remained a fugitive until March 14, 1950, when a Nolle Prosequi order (dropping the case against the defendant) was approved on the recommendation of U.S. Attorney Irving H. Saypol. Griebl had been under indictment for espionage since June 20, 1938.

References 

1899 births
German obstetricians
German Army personnel of World War I
American collaborators with Nazi Germany
People from Yorkville, Manhattan
Year of death missing
Physicians from New York City
German emigrants to the United States